Florence "Flo" Pritchett, also known as Florence Pritchett Smith (June 28, 1920 – November 9, 1965), was an American fashion editor, journalist, and radio and TV personality.

Biography
Florence Pritchett was born on June 28, 1920, in West Orange, New Jersey. In 1940, she married Richard Canning. They divorced in 1943. In 1944, she met John F. Kennedy. The two may have dated. They remained friends into the early 1960s. Pritchett was also romantically linked to actors Robert Walker and Errol Flynn.

Pritchett worked as the fashion editor for New York Journal-American and wrote articles for Photoplay. She appeared as a panelist on the radio and TV program Leave It to the Girls from 1945 to 1953. In 1946, she worked as a special representative for David O. Selznick, helping promote films like Duel in the Sun.

Pritchett married Earl E. T. Smith in 1947. Smith was appointed ambassador to Cuba in 1957. That year, Pritchett established a three-year scholarship for Cuban students to study fashion, textile design, and interior design in the U.S.

Florence Pritchett died on November 9, 1965 in the Manhattan apartment where she lived with her husband and 12-year-old son. She suffered a cerebral hemorrhage after at least several weeks of struggling with leukemia. Her obituaries in the New York Times and New York Journal-American said she had been “in ill health since mid-August” and had been treated for it in what was then called Roosevelt Hospital. Her book, These Entertaining People, was released by Macmillan Publishers in 1966.

The historical importance of These Entertaining People is summarized on the website for a rare book dealer, Nick Harvill Libraries, located in West Hollywood, California. It refers to Dorothy Kilgallen, a syndicated newspaper columnist whose alleged historical importance is linked with Pritchett's in several books about John F. Kennedy assassination conspiracy theories. 
Quoting the Nick Harvill Libraries text: Whatever Kilgallen knew followed her to the grave. She died of an apparent drug and alcohol overdose before telling her story. Her notes were never found. Kilgallen’s death was indeed suspicious, but Pritchett Smith’s [24 hours later] was not. Florence had been suffering from terminal cancer. It is unfortunate that her passing will be forever entangled in assassination conspiracy theories.

References

American fashion journalists
American film people
1920 births
1965 deaths
People from West Orange, New Jersey
American radio personalities
American television personalities
American women television personalities